John Randall Lyon (born 4 March 1952, Trinidad) is a former Trinidad cricketer who played first-class cricket from 1974 to 1983. He toured India in 1978-79 with the West Indian team but did not play Test cricket.

A wicket-keeper and lower-order batsman, Randall Lyon made his first-class debut for North Trinidad in the Texaco Cup in the 1973-74 season. He first played for Trinidad in the 1975-76 Shell Shield, when he led the competition's fielding statistics with 11 dismissals, including five stumpings off the spin bowling of Raphick Jumadeen and Inshan Ali. He continued to play for Trinidad in 1976-77 and 1977-78, making his only first-class fifty against Barbados in 1977-78.

With most of the senior West Indian cricketers playing World Series Cricket in Australia in the 1978-79 season, Lyon was one of several inexperienced players to be selected for the tour of India. He played in most of the first-class matches outside the Tests. He continued to play for Trinidad until the end of the 1982-83 season. 

Until Brendan Nash played in 2008, Lyon was the last white cricketer to represent the West Indies. He lives in Trinidad, where he has coached young wicket-keepers.

References

External links
 Randall Lyon at Cricket Archive
 Randall Lyon at Cricinfo

1952 births
Living people
North Trinidad cricketers
Trinidad and Tobago cricketers